Elmwood, also known as the Watson-Mardre House, is a historic plantation house located near Windsor, Bertie County, North Carolina. It was built about 1836, and expanded between 1838 and 1863.  It is a two-story frame structure three bays wide and two deep, with Greek Revival and Federal style design elements.  It has a gable roof.  Also on the property are the contributing kitchen and dairy.

It was added to the National Register of Historic Places in 1982.

References

Plantation houses in North Carolina
Houses on the National Register of Historic Places in North Carolina
Greek Revival houses in North Carolina
Federal architecture in North Carolina
Houses completed in 1863
Houses in Bertie County, North Carolina
National Register of Historic Places in Bertie County, North Carolina